Mighty Joe Plum was an American alternative rock band active in the late 1990s. They are best known for their US radio hit, "Live Through This (Fifteen Stories)".

History
Mighty Joe Plum formed in Tampa, Florida in the mid-1990s. In their early career, they played in two Battle of the Bands competitions, the second of which they won. After developing a solid fan base in Central Florida, they recorded the "Aardvark" EP and toured in support of it. During this time radio stations picked up the song "Live Through This (Fifteen Stories)" . The band signed to Atlantic Records in 1996 and released an album, The Happiest Dogs. The single "Live Through This" climbed to No. 6 on Billboard's Mainstream Rock Tracks chart. The band toured all over the US, Canada, and Mexico in support of the album, playing shows and headlining with bands such as Foo Fighters, Creed, Matchbox Twenty, Toad the Wet Sprocket, and Seven Mary Three.

in 2007, the band released the single "Free Again", from the forthcoming LP "Pedaling Home".

Discography
Aardvark EP (Ear Drops Music, 1996)
The Happiest Dogs (Atlantic, 1997)

References
[ Mighty Joe Plum at Allmusic.com]

External links
Mighty Joe Plum at MySpace
Mighty Joe Plum on Facebook

Musical groups from Tampa, Florida
American post-grunge musical groups